On February 1, 2017 at around 6:00 p.m. (UTC +8), a fire hit the House Technology Industries, Ltd. factory inside the Cavite Export Processing Zone in General Trias, Cavite.

Incident
On February 1, around 746 employees were at work when the fire started according to Brig. Gen. Charito Plaza, director-general of Philippine Economic Zone Authority (PEZA). At 9pm, the third alarm was immediately raised.

Aftermath
The fire was officially out at 4:15pm on February 3. Remulla said that some survivors suffered about 70% to 90% burns to their bodies.

The claims that there were fatalities which authorities tried to cover up were refuted by Remulla. The fire resulted in five fatalities who all died in hospital and not during the fire incident.

See also
Kentex slipper factory fire

References

2017 disasters in the Philippines
2017 fires in Asia
February 2017 events in the Philippines
Fires in the Philippines
History of Cavite
Factory fires